Showery Tor is a rocky outcrop on a ridge-top approximately  north of the Rough Tor summit, near Camelford on Bodmin Moor in Cornwall. It is notable for its rock formations and prehistoric monuments.

The Tor is a prominent landmark for a wide area. Christopher Tilley has estimated the height of the cairn on which the outcrop stands to be .

The site was thought to have been a religious focal point, possibly from the Neolithic or Bronze Age period. No excavations have been recorded at the site, and it is not known if any burials were made there.

The granite outcrop is reminiscent of the Cheesewring and made of individual blocks on underlying outcrops formed by erosion along horizontal fractures in the granitic mass. Aerial photography has revealed more about the layout of the structures on Showery Tor and it stands out as the only natural formation to have been used in this way by the cairn designers.

Pictures

References

External links

 The Modern Antiquarian illustrated entry about Showery Tor (Rocky Outcrop)
 Geograph Entry on Showery Tor

Megalithic monuments in England
Stone Age sites in Cornwall
Bodmin Moor
History of Cornwall
Archaeological sites in Cornwall
Buildings and structures in Cornwall
Tourist attractions in Cornwall
Bronze Age sites in Cornwall